Antes muerta que Lichita, (English title: Anything but Plain)(More literally, I'd Rather be Dead Than Lichita) is a Mexican telenovela produced by Rosy Ocampo for Televisa.

Plot 
Lichita (Maite Perroni) has been working at Iconika Ad Agency for 10 years but feels undervalued and invisible. She decides to make a change and transforms herself  from the office “whipping girl” into the empowered Alicia. However, no climb to the top is ever easy and, along the way, she faces situations that test her character and values.

Production 
Production of Antes muerta que Lichita officially started on May 18, 2015. The telenovela was formerly known as Más canija que ninguna. It will be the first telenovela in 4K resolution format produced by Televisa.

Webnovela 
During the Univision Upfront, it was confirmed that Antes muerta que Lichita, it will have its own webnovela, which can be seen in the same telenovela and by the Televisa website.

Cast and characters

Main characters  

 Maite Perroni as Alicia Gutiérrez López / Lichita, she is the assistant of Elías and other entrepreneurs of Icónika.
 Eduardo Santamarina as Augusto de Toledo y Mondragón, he is the general president of Icónika.
 Arath de la Torre as Roberto Duarte, he is a fake journalist who reaches Icónika order to obtain a high position in the company.
 Ingrid Martz as Luciana de Toledo y Mondragón, she is the niece and later revealed as the biological daughter of Augusto.
 Chantal Andere as Sandra Madariaga, she is the chief executive officer of Icónika.
 Manuel "Flaco" Ibáñez as Ignacio "Nacho" Gutiérrez, he is the father of Lichita and Magos.
 Luz Elena González as Jesusa “Chuchette”
 Macaria as Fátima
 Gabriela Platas as Beatriz Casablanca de Toledo y Mondragón

Recurring characters 

 Pablo Valentín as Gumaro
 Roberto Blandón as Rafael De Toledo y Mondragón
 Sherlyn as Magos, she is the younger sister of Lichita.
 Eddy Vilard as Alejandro de Toledo y Mondragón Casablanca, he is the son of Augusto and Beatriz, and hides to the world that he is gay for fear of bullying.
 Patricio Borghetti as Néstor Acosta, he is the "account executive" in Icónika.
 Ricardo Fastlicht as Elías Merchant, he is the creative director general of Icónika.
 Felipe Nájera as Marcelo
 Mónica Ayos as Valeria Iribarren 
 Wendy González as Brisa Pacheco, she is the art director in Icónika.
 Diego de Erice as Braulio Moncada, he is the "account executive" in Icónika.
 Ana Paula Martínez as Ximena Gutiérrez López
 Vanessa Díaz as Dafne De Toledo y Mondragón Casablanca
 Patricio de la Garza as Mateo Duarte Uribe
 Jana Raluy as Venus Rodríguez
 Luis Ramón Orozco as El vigilante
 Carla Cardona as Martha
 Ilse Ikeda as Ivonne
 Rebeca Gucón as Ivette
 Oswaldo Zárate as Gerardo "El Gerrys"
 Estrella Solís as Paula 
 Ivan Nevelitchki as Draco
 Sylvia Pasquel as Elsa López de Gutiérrez, she is the mother of Lichita and Magos.

Guest stars 
 Roberto Sen as Héctor Ontiveros
 Fernando Larrañaga as Agente de la API #3
 José María Negri as Macario Santillana
 Roberto D'Amico as Agente de la API #2
 Gonzalo Peña as Ángel
 Mark Tacher as Luis Altamirano
 Gabriel Soto as Santiago de la Vega
 Patricia Navidad as Marlene Garbo 
 Dominika Paleta as Sheyla

Awards and nominations

Mexico broadcast

References

External links 

Mexican telenovelas
Televisa telenovelas
2015 Mexican television series debuts
2015 telenovelas
2010s Mexican television series
Mexican LGBT-related television shows
2016 Mexican television series endings
Spanish-language telenovelas